

Industry
In 1979, Gemstones Corporation of Pakistan was established to develop the gemstones sector in Pakistan, however in 1997 the corporation liquidated. Now a number of organizations are working in this sector including All Pakistan Commercial Exporters Association of Rough & Unpolished Precious and Semi Precious Stones (APCEA) and Pakistan Gems and Jewellery Development Company (PGJDC). Pakistan Gems and Mineral Show is held annually in Peshawar since 1994, however it has not attracted much attention from potential international buyers.

Gem markets
The southern port city of Karachi was once the biggest market of facet and rough cut gems in Pakistan. However, after the Soviet invasion of Afghanistan, the gem market shift to Peshawar. Peshawar became the hub of gemstones trade. Due to the long and porous border with Afghanistan, many gemstones from the country are now also found in Pakistan and since 1979, Peshawar is the only direct market for all gems found both in Pakistan and Afghanistan. Pakistan Gems and Jewellery Development Company regularly holds Gem Bazaars (exhibitions) in Quetta and Peshawar where gemstones attested by Gemstone Identification Laboratory are traded. In Islamabad, so far three such exhibitions have been held. In January 2012 exhibition, around two hundred companies from Pakistan displayed their items. The third Islamabad Gem Exhibition was held in February 2013 where 80 national gem traders displayed their products.

Gem testing labs
The government of Pakistan to has established gem identification laboratories in major cities of Pakistan to promote the gemstone trade in Pakistan. For this purpose, Pakistan Gems and Jewellery Development Company is working in Lahore, Karachi, Peshawar, Quetta, Gilgit, Muzaffarabad and Sargodha cities where the major share of gemstone trade exists. Since the inception of Pakistan Gems & Jewellery Development Company, the gemstone trade in Pakistan has seen a major uplift.

There are also some private gem identification labs in Lahore, Karachi, and Peshawar which have qualified gemologists working in their labs.

Mining areas

Pakistan's western and northern areas are home to three mountain ranges; Hindukush, Himalaya, and Karakorum which are home to all the minerals found in Pakistan. Some of the major mining areas along with their main gemstone yields are mentioned below:

Khyber Pakhtunkhwa
The province of Khyber Pakhtunkhwa has three large mountain ranges: Hindukush covers the area to north and north-west, Karakoram to the north and north-east, and Himalayas to the east. According to Bureau of Statistics of Khyber Pakhtunkhwa, 2568 tonnes of baryte and 85 tonnes of corundum were produced in 2005-2006 and 1416 tonnes of quartz was produced in 2006-2007 in the province. According to one source, Swat has reserves of 70 million carats of emerald, Mardan has reserves of 9 million carats of pink topaz and Kohistan has 10 million carats worth of reserves of peridot.

Tribal areas
The Federally Administered Tribal Areas are strategically located between the Afghanistan and Khyber Pakhtunkhwa province of Pakistan. The region is mostly dry and barren with hilly northern Bajaur and Mohmand agencies. In the central agencies of Khyber, Kurram, and Orakzai, the Safed Koh range is located while in the two southern agencies of Waziristan, the Sulaiman range along with Waziristan hills are located. A large variety of minerals and gemstones are found in these mountains: emerald and tourmaline are found in the north, and garnet and quartz are found in the Bajaur and South Waziristan agencies. Department of Minerals is the government department working for the exploration and development of the mining industry in the region. According to their report, 29759 tons of quartz was produced in Mohmand agency in 2003-2004. However, the gemstone sector in the region is not developed and many resources have not been properly identified and exploited.

Gilgit Baltistan
The three mountain ranges of Gilgit-Baltistan; Himalayas, Hindukush, and Karakoram contain many minerals and gems including emerald, ruby, sapphire, aquamarine, moonstone, and amethyst. A number of other minerals are also found in the region such as peridot, tourmaline, topaz, garnet, red spinal, pargasite, diopside, sphene, apatite, azurite, rose quartz, and agate. In Swat, pale green to green coloured emeralds can be found in talc-carbonate schist. In Hunza, well formed pink to red crystals of ruby are found, while in Neelum valley high quality rubies also occur.

Balochistan
Balochistan is the largest province of Pakistan by area and is covered by rough terrain and rugged mountain ranges. Major mountain ranges of the province include Makran, Sulaiman, Toba Kakar, and Kirthar. The main gemstones that are traded in the region include emerald, apatite, sapphire, agate, tourmaline, ruby, topaz, turquoise, lapis lazuli, quartz, garnet, and peridot.

See also

List of minerals of Pakistan

References

Bibliography
 Kazmi, A.H.; Snee, L.W.; Anwar, Jawaid. Emeralds Of Pakistan: Geology, gemology and genesis. Geological Survey of Pakistan, 1989. .
 Kazmi, A.H.; O'Donoghue, Michael.  Gemstones of Pakistan:geology and gemmology. Gemstone Corp. of Pakistan, 1990.

Geology of Pakistan
Gemology
Economy of Pakistan